The Long-Playing EP is the fourth and final record from Atlanta rock group Y-O-U, released in July 2009. It consists of five new tracks and eight tracks taken from previous Y-O-U releases; the new songs originally having been intended for a 2008 album which fell through. According to lead singer Nick Niespodziani, the first three of the new songs from The Long-Playing EP were also planned to appear on a new LP to be released in 2010; however, the retirement of Y-O-U renders that plan moot.

Track listing
"Firefly" (Niespodziani/Boyd) - 4:24
"Going Down Swinging" (Niespodziani) - 4:32
"Honest Man" (Niespodziani) - 4:32
"Moviekiss: The Lite Brite Remix" (Niespodziani/Olson/Cobb/Park/Sonnicksen) - 5:12
"Beautiful Thing" (Niespodziani/Olson/Cobb) - 3:59
"The Physics of Giving"C (Niespodziani) - 4:23
"Not a Dove"B (Niespodziani/Olson/Cobb) - 3:11
"Second Chance"C (Niespodziani/Olson/Cobb) - 3:43
"Good Intentions"A (Niespodziani/Olson/Cobb/Park/Sonnicksen) - 2:34
"Good Luck with That American Dream"B (Niespodziani/Olson/Cobb) - 4:05
"Easy"A (Niespodziani/Olson/Cobb/Park/Sonnicksen) - 3:16
"I Found You"C (Niespodziani/Olson/Cobb) - 2:12
"Break"C (Niespodziani) - 5:11

A: from Y-O-U
B: from Everything is Shifting
C: from Flashlights

Music video
"Moviekiss: The Lite Brite Remix"
Dir: Gina Niespodziani
Animated with a Lite Brite by the Niespodziani siblings.

Personnel

Y-O-U
 Mark Bencuya - keyboards
 Mark Cobb - drums, percussion, vocals
 Nicholas Niespodziani - lead vocals, guitar, harmonica
 Peter Olson - bass, vocals

Additional musicians
 Horns: David B. Freeman, Wes Funderburk
 Backing vocals: Trina Meade, Stephani Parker

Technical
 Producer: Ben H. Allen
 Mastering: Glen Schick
 Assistant: Rob Gardner
 Photography: Gina Niespodziani
 Art concept: Nick & Gina Niespodziani

References
 Official site
 Atlanta Music Guide interview with Nick Niespodziani, 21 July 2009

2009 EPs
Y-O-U albums